The 2019 cyberattacks on Sri Lanka were a series of powerful cyberattacks on at least 10 Sri Lankan domestic websites with the public domains of .lk and .com. The cyberattack is speculated to have been conducted on 18 and 19 May 2019, the day following the Vesak festival and amid the persistent temporary social media ban in the country. The website of the Kuwaiti Embassy operating in Sri Lanka was also affected by the cyberattacks. The investigations are currently carried out by Sri Lanka Computer Emergency Readiness Team along with Sri Lanka Signals Corps.

References 

Cyberattacks
Hacking in the 2010s
2019 in computing
Sri Lanka
Cyberattacks
Terrorist incidents in Asia in 2019
Cyberattacks
Cyberattacks
Cyberattacks
2010s internet outages